Time for Elizabeth is a 1948 play written by Norman Krasna and Groucho Marx.

Krasna and Marx were good friends and Krasna says writing it took 10–15 years.

The original Broadway production was directed by Krasna, and starred Otto Kruger. Opening at the Fulton Theatre, it only ran for eight performances, from September 27 to October 2, 1948. The reviews were universally bad, with Brooks Atkinson at The New York Times writing that "Mr. Marx has everyone's permission to throw down the pen and put back the moustachio any time he pleases." However, film rights were sold to Warner Bros for $500,000.

The play toured as a summer stock production in the summers of 1957, 1958, 1959 and 1963, with co-author Groucho Marx playing the lead. Thanks to Marx's presence and an increasing number of Groucho-style jokes added to the script over time, the tours were well received.

Time for Elizabeth was adapted for TV in 1964, with Marx playing the lead.

References

External links
 
  (archive)
 Review of play at Variety

Plays by Norman Krasna
1948 plays
Broadway plays